Stephen Shin is a fictional character appearing in comic books published by DC Comics. He is a supporting character of Aquaman who debuted during "The New 52" reboot. Stephen Shin first appeared in Aquaman (vol. 7) #2 (December 2011) and was created by Geoff Johns and Ivan Reis.

Shin made his live-action cinematic debut in the 2018 DC Extended Universe film Aquaman, portrayed by Randall Park and will return in the upcoming 2023 sequel Aquaman and the Lost Kingdom.

Fictional character biography
Stephen Shin is a marine biologist who befriends lighthouse keeper Tom Curry and his son with the sea-dwelling Atlanna, Arthur Curry, the future Aquaman. He has more knowledge of Atlantis than any other surface-dweller. Shin helps Arthur develop his powers, but turns on his protege when he refuses to reveal the location of Atlantis.

Some years later, Aquaman and Mera pay a visit to Shin, asking for his help to identify strange sea creatures. He does, but is angered again when Aquaman refuses to let him keep one.

After Aquaman and Mera help some ships get to the coast before a storm hits, the two of them pay a visit to Stephen Shin to see if he can help figure out the Atlantean artifact that they have. They ask him if he knows of the identity of the person who sank Atlantis. Shin states that it was possible for someone to sink Atlantis and mentions that it has enemies due to it being the most powerful civilization in the world. When he asked about the creatures that came from the Trench, Aquaman stated that he caused a volcanic explosion that trapped them there. Just then, a woman named Ya'Wara breaks into Stephen's house in order to kill him only for Mera to take action. When Aquaman breaks up the fight, Ya'Wara tells him that Black Manta killed Kahina, took the gold seal that she had, and believed Stephen told Black Manta about it. As Ya'Wara believes that Stephen Shin is in league with Black Manta, Aquaman says that they need him to find the missing relics as Aquaman has Stephen start looking. He does warn Shin that if he is in any way connected to Kahina's death, he will allow Ya'Wara to feed him to her pet jaguar. Shin returns to work on the Atlantean black box as Mera asks him about Black Manta and what he knows about the Others. When Mera keeps asking Stephen Shin about Black Manta, he states that he hasn't seen Black Manta in years. He explains that he met Tom Curry and his son Arthur years ago when Tom saved him from an expedition that went wrong. While he did get the knowledge of Atlantis during that time, Tom refused to have Arthur's abilities revealed to the media as Shin states that it can save his career. Shin then tells Mera about a treasure hunter that he found shipwrecked off the coast of Iceland and had fought off a group of pirates. Mera believed that the treasure hunter was Black Manta which Shin confirms. Though he denied that Black Manta had a hand in Tom Curry's death by stating that Tom died of a heart attack and Aquaman later killed Black Manta's father. As Mera still doesn't trust Stephen Shin after he revealed Aquaman to the public, he states that he is not the man that she thinks he is. He also explains that on the day of Tom Curry's funeral, Aquaman attacked Black Manta's ship where it was revealed that the captain was Black Manta's father while Black Manta was the diver. When Black Manta arrives to abduct Stephen Shin, Mera fights him until Black Manta stuns Mera and teleports away with Stephen. When Aquaman arrives at King Atlan's tomb, Black Manta tries to get Stephen to help him only for Stephen to decline as he does not want to betray Aquaman again. After getting information from the Operative on where Stephen Shin was taken, Mera heads to King Atlan's tomb. At King Atlan's tomb, Black Manta has the Dead King's Scepter in his hand as he orders his men to kill Stephen only to Aquaman to fight Black Manta's minions. As Ya'Wara believes Stephen to be responsible for Black Manta obtaining the Dead King's Scepter, she starts to attack only for Vostok to stop her saying that Stephen has regretted his actions. After the Others regrouped at the Operative's airplane, Stephen Shin still feels remorse for what happened to Tom Curry only for Aquaman to tell him that what happened to Tom wasn't his fault.

As Aquaman faced off against Ocean Master during the "Throne of Atlantis" storyline, Cyborg is instructed to protect Stephen Shin. Stephen Shin and Nuidis Vulko watch the news about the war from the computers of the Justice League Watchtower. When the reporters claim that Aquaman will betray the Justice League, Stephen refuses to believe that fact. Vulko reminds Stephen about his past actions towards Aquaman. He then attacks and knocks out Stephen while ranting about how he was banished after Aquaman left Atlantis.

Powers and abilities
Stephen Shin has genius-level intellect.

In other media
 Stephen Shin appears in Justice League: Throne of Atlantis, voiced by Matthew Yang King.
 An alternate incarnation of Stephen Shin appears in Justice League: Gods and Monsters, voiced by Eric Bauza. This version is a member of Project Fair Play, a contingency program developed to counter their universe's Justice League if necessary. After three of their number are killed, the remaining scientists regroup at Karen Beecher's house, but they are all slaughtered by the Metal Men.
 Stephen Shin appears in films set in the DC Extended Universe (DCEU), portrayed by Randall Park.
 Introduced in Aquaman, this version is a former United States Institute of Marine Science officer who was fired for seemingly making conspiracy theories about Atlantis and claiming that they are plotting to attack the surface world. In a mid-credits scene, he rescues Black Manta. While nursing him back to health, Shin realizes Manta's suit is made from Atlantean technology. Manta agrees to tell him how he received it in exchange for Shin helping him find Aquaman.
 Park will reprise his role in the upcoming sequel Aquaman and the Lost Kingdom.

References

External links
 Stephen Shin at DC Comics Wiki
 Stephen Shin at Comic Vine

DC Comics male characters
DC Comics scientists
Characters created by Geoff Johns
Characters created by Ivan Reis
Fictional biologists